The Men's points race competition at the 2019 UCI Track Cycling World Championships was held on 1 March 2019.

Results
The race was started at 18:30. 160 laps (40 km), with 16 sprints were raced.

References

Men's points race
2019